John Murray Anderson's Almanac is a musical revue, featuring the music of the songwriting team of Richard Adler and Jerry Ross, as well as other composers. It was conceived by John Murray Anderson.

Productions
John Murray Anderson's Almanac opened on Broadway on December 10, 1953 at the Imperial Theatre, New York City and closed on June 26, 1954, after 229 performances. The revue was conceived and staged by John Murray Anderson, with sketches directed by Cyril Ritchard, and dances and musical numbers staged by Donald Saddler.The revue starred Harry Belafonte, Hermione Gingold, Polly Bergen, Orson Bean, Carleton Carpenter, Tina Louise, Monique van Vooren, and Billy DeWolfe. The songwriting team of Richard Adler and Jerry Ross provided the majority of the songs for the show.

The sketches were written by Jean Kerr, Sumner Lock-Elliot, Arthur Macrae, Herbert Farjeon, Lauri Wylie and Billy K. Wells.

Songs
Act 1
Prologue: Harlequinade – Pierrette Ensemble, Jimmy Albright, Lee Becker, Hank Brunjes, Carleton Carpenter, Ronald Cecill, Dean Crane, Nanci Crompton, Imelda De Martin, Dorothy Dushock, James Jewell, Gerard Leavitt, Celia Lipton, Greb Lober, Ralph McWilliams, Harry Mimmo, Ilona Murai, Margot Myers, Gwen Neilson, Gloria Smith
Queen for a Day
My Cousin Who? – Billy DeWolfe, Jimmy Albright, Ronald Cecill, Dean Crane, Celia Lipton, Ralph McWilliams, Illona Murai, Gwen Neilson, Kenneth Urmston, Toni Wheelis
You're So Much a Part of Me – Carleton Carpenter, Elaine Dunn
I Dare to Dream – Polly Bergen
The Cello – Hermione Gingold
Mark Twain – Harry Belafonte, Millard Thomas (Guitarist)
The Nightingale and the Rose – Jimmy Albright, Hank Brunjes, Ronald Cecill, James Jewell, Gerard Leavitt, Celia Lipton, Greb Lober, Tina Louise, Ralph McWilliams, Margot Myers, Gwen Neilson, George Reeder, Siri, Gloria Smith, Monique Van Vooren
My Love is a Wanderer
The Pan Alley (Mammy Songs, Rhythm Songs, Torch Songs, Patriotic Songs)– Lee Becker, Carleton Carpenter, Ronald Cecill, Dean Crane, Imelda De Martin, Dorothy Dushock, Jay Harnick, Larry Kert, Bob Kole, Gerard Leavitt, Greb Lober, Ralph McWilliams, Illona Murai, Margot Myers, George Reeder, Gloria Smith, Kenneth Urmston
Hope you Come Back – Polly Bergen, Billy DeWolfe, Hermione Gingold, Nanci Crompton, Elaine Dunn, Kay Medford
 
Act 2
If Every Month Were June – Celia Lipton
Which Witch – Hermione Gingold (song by Charles Zwar)
La Loge – Polly Bergen, Jay Harnick
Acorn in the Meadow – Harry Belafonte
When Am I Going to Meet your Mother? – Carleton Carpenter, Elaine Dunn, singer/dancer
Dinner for One – Billy DeWolfe, Hermione Gingold
Hold 'em Joe – Harry Belafonte, Colleen Hutchins, Illona Murai, George Reeder, Gloria Smith, and Monique Van Vooren (dancers) (song by Harry Thomas)
La Pistachio – Billy DeWolfe, Kay Medford

Critical response
Brooks Atkinson reviewing for The New York Times called it a "bright and brilliant show", and had special praise for Hermione Gingold, who "gives herself artistic airs that are hilarious", and Harry Belafonte's "Mark Twain" performance, "expository style as a singer and actor makes it the 'Almanac's' high point in theatrical artistry." However, Atkinson wrote that the "Almanac is more distinguished for its humor. Jean Kerr...has written a gruesome jest about horror literature, 'My Cousin Who?'"

Awards
 Harry Belafonte won the 1954 Tony Award for Best Featured Actor in a Musical.
 In 1954, Orson Bean and Harry Belafonte each received Theatre World Awards for their outstanding performances.

References

External links

1953 musicals
Broadway musicals
Revues
Musicals by Richard Adler
Tony Award-winning musicals